Rancilio is an espresso machine manufacturer, founded in 1927 by Roberto Rancilio in Parabiago, Italy.

Rancilio's earliest machine was 'La Regina' – a vertical boiler machine, similar to the original Bezzera and Victoria Arduino devices in function and gilded 'Belle Epoque' styling.

In 1950, Rancilio released a horizontal boiler machine, the Invicta Horizzontal, showing evidence of the postwar shift toward spare, modern styling. The machine however, still used the same forced-steam brewing method from the early 20th century. By 1953, Rancilio adopted lever piston technology introduced by Gaggia. In 1957, Rancilio released a model which automated the lever process, the H/L Automatica. The company followed new technological trends towards continuous deliver brewing introduced by Faema in 1961. In 1965, Rancilio commissioned design work from industrial designer Marco Zanuso, beginning with the Rancilio Z8, and continuing with the Z9 in 1974.  Rancilio continued with several Z-series machines, with the Z11 being the last.  The S-series machine would become popular in the 1990s, and become well known in the North American marketplace.

In 1997, Rancilio created a home kitchen-sized espresso machine based on their commercial offerings. This was initially only available as a thank-you gift to importers and vendors of Rancilio's restaurant-grade coffee machines. This machine was later sold to consumers as the Silvia. The Silvia is a one group machine with a vibratory pump from ULKA and a single brass boiler that's controlled by 3 thermostats for both steam and hot water. It is frequently sold with its companion Rocky grinder that is available in doserless and dosered models with stepped settings.

In 2001, Rancilio revamped their lineup, introducing the basic Epoca, and the Classe series. In 2011, they introduced a new advanced brewing system for the Classe 9 called Xcelsius, which gives precise control of water temperature during the brewing cycle.

Rancilio made an attempt at a super-automatic machine, the Classe 12, and used cafes in Borders bookstores as a test market. It was deemed a failure, recalled, and abandoned. They subsequently purchased the Swiss Egro brand of super-automatic machines and have built a presence in that market with their Egro One.

In October 2013 Rancilio was acquired by Ali group.

See also 

 Bialetti
 Cimbali
 De'Longhi
 Elektra (espresso machines)
 Faema
 FrancisFrancis
 Gaggia
 La Marzocco
 Saeco
 List of Italian companies

References

External links

Rancilio Official Site

Espresso machines
Home appliance brands
Home appliance manufacturers of Italy
Companies based in Lombardy
Coffee appliance vendors
Manufacturing companies established in 1927
1927 establishments in Italy
Italian brands
Coffee in Italy